Coresus Sacrificing Himself to Save Callirhoe is a large oil-on-canvas painting by the French Rococo artist Jean-Honoré Fragonard, created in 1765. The painting was exhibited at the Salon of 1765 and earned Fragonard entry into the Académie Royale.

Scene
The story is described in Description of Greece (VII, 21), by Pausanias. During a time of plague, the inhabitants of the ancient Greek city of Calydon ask the oracle at Dodona how they might end the plague that has fallen upon the population. The oracle replies that they must sacrifice a beautiful girl named Callirhoe or find someone to die for her. At the climax of the story, the victim is brought to the temple where the head priest, a man named Coresus, who has always loved Callirhoe, has the task of slaying her to save the city. Fragonard's painting depicts Coresus plunging a knife into his body, sacrificing himself to save Callirhoe, who has fainted.

History
The painting was exhibited at the Salon of 1765 and earned Fragonard entry into the Académie Royale. It has been often described as Fragonard's effort to combine his own tendencies with academic requirements and it stands in stark contrast to the paintings for which Fragonard would later be known, erotic domestic scenes and figures of fantasy.

The work was acquired by  Louis XV and is now in the Musée du Louvre, Paris. The preparatory sketch for the work belongs to the collection of the Musée des Beaux-Arts d'Angers, and a ricordo has been part of the Real Academia de Bellas Artes de San Fernando in Madrid since 1816. Later, Fragonard created a loose chalk sketch of the same scene but at a smaller scale. This drawing is currently in the collection of the Metropolitan Museum of Art, New York City.

Gallery

References

Paintings by Jean-Honoré Fragonard
1765 paintings
Paintings in the Louvre by French artists